Senator Hill may refer to:

United States Senate members
Benjamin Harvey Hill (1823–1882), U.S. Senator from Georgia from 1877 to 1882
David B. Hill (1843–1910), U.S. Senator from New York from 1892 to 1897
Isaac Hill (1789–1851), U.S. Senator from New Hampshire from 1831 to 1836
J. Lister Hill (1894–1984), U.S. Senator from Alabama from 1938 to 1969
Joshua Hill (politician) (1812–1891), U.S. Senator from Georgia from 1871 to 1873
Nathaniel P. Hill (1832–1900), U.S. Senator from Colorado from 1879 to 1885
William Luther Hill (1873–1951), U.S. Senator from Florida in 1936

United States state senate members
Albert E. Hill (1870–1933), Tennessee State Senate
Andy Hill (politician) (1962–2016), Washington State Senate
Angela Burks Hill (born 1965), Mississippi State Senate
Brent Hill (politician) (born 1949), Idaho State Senate
Dawn Hill (born 1969), Maine State Senate
Ebenezer J. Hill (1845–1917), Connecticut State Senate
Henry W. Hill (1853–1929), New York State Senate
Hunter Hill (politician) (born 1977), Georgia State Senate
James Hill (Wisconsin state legislator) (1825–1897), Wisconsin State Senate
Jerry Hill (politician) (born 1947), California State Senate
Jim Hill (Oregon politician) (born 1947), Oregon State Senate
John Fremont Hill (1855–1912), Maine State Senate
John Sprunt Hill (1869–1961), North Carolina State Senate
John Hill (New Jersey politician) (1821–1884), New Jersey State Senate
John Hill (North Carolina politician) (1797–1861), North Carolina State Senate
Judson Hill (born 1959), Georgia State Senate
Louis G. Hill (1924–2013), Pennsylvania State Senate
Mark Langdon Hill (1772–1842), Massachusetts State Senate
Owen Hill (born 1982), Colorado State Senate
Rees Hill (1776–1852), Pennsylvania State Senate
Tony Hill (politician) (born 1957), Florida State Senate
William Henry Hill (New York politician) (1876–1972), New York State Senate
William Henry Hill (North Carolina politician) (1767–1809), North Carolina State Senate